The 2002 Volvo Women's Open was a women's tennis tournament played on outdoor hard courts in Pattaya, Thailand. It was part of Tier V of the 2002 WTA Tour. It was the 12th edition of the tournament and was held from 4 November through 10 November 2002. Unseeded Angelique Widjaja won the singles title and earned $16,000 first-prize money.

Finals

Singles
 Angelique Widjaja defeated  Cho Yoon-jeong, 6–2, 6–4
 This was Widjaja's 1st singles title of the year and the 2nd of her career.

Doubles
 Kelly Liggan /  Renata Voráčová defeated  Lina Krasnoroutskaya /  Tatiana Panova, 7–5, 7–6(9–7)

References

External links
 ITF tournament edition details
 Tournament draws

 WTA Tour
 in women's tennis
Tennis, WTA Tour, Volvo Women's Open
Tennis, WTA Tour, Volvo Women's Open

Tennis, WTA Tour, Volvo Women's Open